Ernest Charles Walbourn (16 February 1872 Dalston, Middlesex - 29 June 1927) was a British landscape painter of rural and farming scenes. He was the second of five children and was educated locally. His father, who owned property in Tasmania/Australia, initially disapproved of his artistic ambitions, but later helped with the setting up of a studio at the family home and the funding of his art training.

In 1895 he settled in Chingford, Essex and began exhibiting at the Royal Institute of Oil Painters. From 1897 his paintings were exhibited at the Royal Academy and at the Royal Society of British Artists. His works were well received, many being sold through the London art dealers, W. W. Sampson & Louis Wolfe. In 1906, he married Eva Gardner who assisted by painting the backgrounds of some of his larger works, later achieving recognition in her own right.

References

19th-century British painters
British male painters
20th-century British painters
1872 births
1927 deaths
People from Dalston
19th-century British male artists
20th-century British male artists